Howard Jerome Morris (September 4, 1919 – May 21, 2005) was an American actor, comedian, and director. He was best known for his role in The Andy Griffith Show as Ernest T. Bass, and as "Uncle Goopy" in a celebrated comedy sketch on Sid Caesar's Your Show of Shows (1954). He also did some voices for television shows such as The Flintstones (1962-1965), The Jetsons (1962-1987), The Atom Ant Show (1965-1966), and Garfield and Friends (1988-1994).

Life and career
Morris was born to a Jewish family in the Bronx, New York, the son of Hugo and Elsie (née Theobald) Morris. His father was a rubber company executive. Morris attended New York University on a dramatic arts scholarship. During World War II, Howard was assigned to a United States Army Special Services unit where he was the First Sergeant. Maurice Evans was the company commander and Carl Reiner and Werner Klemperer were soldiers in the unit. Based in Honolulu, the unit entertained American troops throughout the Pacific.

He came to prominence in appearances on Sid Caesar's Your Show of Shows (a live sketch comedy series appearing weekly in the United States, from 1950 to 1954). In April 1954, Morris joined Caesar and Carl Reiner in "This Is Your Story," an 11-minute takeoff on Ralph Edwards's This Is Your Life. Morris claimed it was his favorite sketch role. As The New Yorker'''s David Margolick wrote in 2014,

 This opinion is shared by The New York Times  and Hollywood.com, among others. Conan O'Brien tweeted in 2014, "Saw this Sid Caesar sketch when I was a kid. It made me want to make people laugh." Billy Crystal later called it a defining early influence: "That's how I used to go to bed. I'd grab my dad's leg, and he'd drag me to bed like Sid Caesar." The sketch can be viewed here, Morris enters at the 4:14 mark.

Morris also appeared twice in 1957 in episodes of the short-lived NBC comedy/variety show The Polly Bergen Show.

Although Morris was a classically trained Shakespearean actor, he is best remembered for playing the wily and over-the-top mountain man character Ernest T. Bass on The Andy Griffith Show. Also, he played George, the TV mechanic in the episode, "Andy and Helen Have Their Day." He had lampooned southern accents while in the army at Fort Bragg, North Carolina. He starred in one of the more comical early hour-long Twilight Zone episodes, "I Dream of Genie." Other roles included that of Elmer Kelp in The Nutty Professor, a movie studio clerk in the short film Star Spangled Salesman, and an art appraiser in an episode of The Dick Van Dyke Show. He also had appeared in several Broadway shows including the highly regarded 1960 revival of Finian's Rainbow as Og the leprechaun opposite Bobby Howes as Finian. He played the role of Schmidlap in Way... Way Out and appeared in the movie, Boys' Night Out (1962) starring Tony Randall, Kim Novak and James Garner.

Voice acting
Morris was first heard in animated cartoons in the early 1960s. He and Allan Melvin teamed up for a 50-episode King Features Syndicate series, Beetle Bailey, for which he and Melvin also wrote a number of episodes. He also provided the voices for Gene Deitch's Academy Award-winning Munro, about a four-year-old boy who was drafted into the Army.

Beginning in 1962, Morris played a variety of voices in many Hanna-Barbera series including The Jetsons as Jet Screamer who sang the "Eep opp ork ah ah!" song, (said to be Morris' first work for Hanna-Barbera) and The Flintstones. He was the original voice of Atom Ant and provided the voice of Mr. Peebles in The Magilla Gorilla Show, teaming up again with Allan Melvin who performed the voice for Magilla. In another series, Morris was heard as the voice of Breezly Bruin which was similar in tone with the Bill Scott vocalization of Bullwinkle. Morris had a disagreement with Joseph Barbera prior to production of the 1966–1967 season of Magilla Gorilla and Atom Ant and all of his voices were recast, mostly using Don Messick. Years later, the two men reconciled and Morris was back doing those voices and others. He also lent his voice to Forsythe "Jughead" Jones on Filmation's series The Archies through the life of the franchise, 1968–1977. Moreover, he was the voice of Leonard Blush, "The Masked Singer" - he had a skin condition - as well as the regular voice of the Mount Pilot radio station's host on The Andy Griffith Show.

Morris also voiced the characters Professor Icenstein and Luigi La Bounci in the animated series Galaxy High. He voiced Mayor McCheese and later the Hamburglar (taking over for Larry Storch in 1986) in McDonaldland ad campaign for McDonald's, which Morris also directed. He provided the voice of Wade Duck in the U.S. Acres segments of Garfield and Friends, and voiced Webbly in Bobby's World and Flem in Cow & Chicken. Morris supplied the voice of the koala in TV commercials for Qantas from 1967 through 1992 (saying the tagline, "I hate Qantas"), and voiced the character of Gopher in the Disney featurettes Winnie the Pooh and the Honey Tree and Winnie the Pooh and the Blustery Day. Also in 1989, he voiced a French gangster cat named Monte De Zar (Fat Cat's Cousin) in an episode of Disney's Chip 'n Dale: Rescue Rangers episode "Le Purrfect Crime".

Voice directing
While Morris continued to make himself available for voice and sound effect roles, he also began a new career in voice directing. Among the projects he directed are Police Academy, Richie Rich, Bionic Six, Goin' Coconuts, Pole Position, Galaxy High, The Snorks, The Mighty Orbots, Rose Petal Place, The Dogfather, Dragon's Lair, Tom and Jerry: The Movie, Turbo Teen, Cabbage Patch Kids: First Christmas, Little Clowns of Happytown, The Little Wizards, Space Stars and Kidd Video.

Directing and later career
Morris directed some episodes of The Andy Griffith Show, Gomer Pyle, Hogan's Heroes, The Dick Van Dyke Show, the black and white pilot episode of Get Smart and later, episodes of One Day at a Time, Bewitched, and single episodes of many other comedy shows.

Morris also directed Doris Day in her final film, With Six You Get Eggroll (1968). Other films he directed were Don't Drink the Water (1969) and Who's Minding the Mint? (1967).

Mel Brooks occasionally cast Morris in his films. For example, he played Brooks' mentor psychiatrist Dr. Lilloman in the comedy High Anxiety (1977), the emperor's court spokesman ("Here, wash this!") in History of the World, Part I (1981), and played a bum named Sailor living in the streets in Life Stinks (1991).

In 1984, he played Dr. Zidell in Splash, a film directed by Ron Howard (the two had first worked together on The Andy Griffith Show). He worked with his old friend and trouping partner Sid Caesar as nervous Jewish tailors in the 1998 movie of Ray Bradbury's The Wonderful Ice Cream Suit.

In 1986, he reprised his famous role as Ernest T. Bass in the high-rated television movie Return to Mayberry. 

In 1989, he guest starred on Murder, She Wrote.

From 1997 to 1999, he played Flem on Cow and Chicken.

Personal life
Morris was married and divorced five times. He was first married to Mary Helen McGowan from 1945 to 1962. He married his second wife Dolores A. Wylie later in 1962; the marriage lasted until 1977 when they divorced. Throughout his marriages, he had three daughters and a son, along with three grandchildren.

Death
On May 21, 2005, Morris died of congestive heart failure, at the age of 85. At his funeral, the "Uncle Goopy" sketch was shown; among the eulogizers was Carl Reiner, who praised Morris's ability to improvise. He is entombed in Laurel Gardens Wall crypt at Hillside Memorial Park Cemetery in Culver City, California.

Filmography
FilmMunro (1961) - narratorBoys Night Out (1962) - Howard McIllenny40 Pounds of Trouble (1962) - JuliusThe Nutty Professor (1963) - Elmer KelpLoopy DeLoop (Habit Rabbit) (1963, Short) - Raymond (voice)Fluffy (1965) - SweeneyWinnie the Pooh and the Honey Tree (1966, Short) - Gopher (voice)Alice of Wonderland in Paris (1966) - The Frowning Prince / King (segment "The Frowning Prince") / Grand Wizard (voice)Way...Way Out (1966) - SchmidlapThe Big Mouth (1967) - Cameo Role (uncredited)With Six You Get Eggroll (1968) - Hippie in Police Station (uncredited)Winnie the Pooh and the Blustery Day (1968, Short) - Gopher (voice)Don't Drink the Water (1969) - Getaway Pilot (uncredited)The Comic (1969) - Pedestrian Gag Man in Love Honor and Oh Boy (uncredited)Daffy Duck and Porky Pig Meet the Groovie Goolies (1972) - Franklin 'Frankie' Frankenstein / Wolfgang 'Wolfie' Wolfman / Mummy / "Hauntleroy" (voice)Ten from Your Show of Shows (1973)The Many Adventures of Winnie the Pooh (1977) - Gopher (voice)High Anxiety (1977) - Professor LillomanHistory of the World, Part I (1981) - Court Spokesman (The Roman Empire)Splash (1984) - Dr. ZidellReturn to Mayberry (1986, TV Movie) - Ernest T. BassEnd of the Line (1987) - HoboThe Good, the Bad, and Huckleberry Hound (1988, TV Movie) - Mr. Peebles / Chuckling Chipmunk / Governor / DentistTransylvania Twist (1989) - Marinas OrlockLife Stinks (1991) - SailorTom and Jerry: The Movie (1992) - Squawk (voice)I Yabba-Dabba Do! (1993, TV Movie) - (voice)Hollyrock-a-Bye Baby (1993, TV Movie) - Bird (voice)A Flintstones Christmas Carol (1994, TV movie) - (voice)Lasting Silents (1997) - Julius DavisThe Wonderful Ice Cream Suit (1998) - Leo Zellman

TelevisionThe Twilight Zone (1963) (TV series) - season 4 - episode 12 - I Dream of Genie - George P. HanleyWanted: Dead or Alive (1961) - episode - Detour - Clayton ArmstrongAlfred Hitchcock Presents (1962) - episode - Most Likely to SucceedThriller (1962) (U.S. TV series) - season 2 - episode 29 - The Lethal LadiesThe Flintstones (1962–1965) - 28 episodes - Doctor / Boy / Pilot / Soldier #1 / Sergeant / Cop / Bird #1 / Mr. Rockhard / Charles / Coach / Cat / Boy #1 / Boy #3 / Rodney Whetstone / Dr. Pilldown / Monkey / Letter Opening Bird / Turtle #2 / Guy in Crowd / Clerk / Kid / Porcupine / The Kissing Burglar / Henry / Cop #1 / Ted Stonevan / Tex Bricker / Filbert / Knitting Kneedle / Chisel Bird / Turtle Butler / Jimmy / Quartz / Member #2 / Member #4 / Ticket Taker / Reporter / Guard / Announcer / Pilot / Traffic Cop / Black Lamb / Eddie / Clam / Turtle / Manager / Customer / Dr. Corset / Brick / Bird / Man #1 / Man #3 / Man #4 / Ollie / Slag / Card Player #2 / Bobby / Announcer / Parrot / Herman / Chimp / Horse / Sam / BirdGeneral / Peter / Al / Mop / Tortoise / Mammoth / Alligator / Detective #2 / Hotrock / Oyster / Traffic Cop #2 / Kid #2 / Monkey #2 / Elmo / Elephant / Lucy / TV Announcer / Cat / Buffalo #3 / Emcee / Bird in Tree / Rockoff / Official / Proprietor / Joe / Tall Detective / Customs Man / Percy / Pa / Slab / Possum / 1st Dinosaur / Attendant / Treasurer / Scotsman / Baggage Monkey / Reggie / Horn Bird / Dragon / Actor / Doc / Jethro Hatrock / Spider / Flower / 'Uncle' / TV Announcer / Weirdly Gruesome / The Kissing Burglar / Slab / Waiter The Jetsons (1962–1987) - 14 episodes - Harlan / Bank Security Guard #1 / Traffic Cop / Molecular Motors Video Tailor #2 / Montique Jetson / Nimbus the Great / George's Conscience / Willie / Mr. Tweeter / Emcee / Jet Screamer / Henry Orbit (1 episode) / Boppo Crushstar / CB / Bus DriverThe Dick Van Dyke Show (1963) - episode - The Masterpiece - Mr. HoldeckerBeetle Bailey (1963) - Beetle Bailey / Gen. Halftrack / Lt. Fuzz / Otto / Chaplain Staneglass / RockyThe Andy Griffith Show (1963–1965) - 8 episodes - Ernest T. Bass / Radio Announcer / Leonard Blush / George - the TV Repairman Make Room for Daddy (1964) - episode - The Leprechaun - SeanThe Magilla Gorilla Show (1964–1965) - Mr. PeeblesPunkin' Puss and Mushmouse (1964–1966) - MushmouseBreezly and Sneezly (1964–1966) - Breezly BruinThe Lucy Show (1965) - Season 4/Episode 2 - "Lucy and the Golden Greek" - Howie (Lucy's blind date) The Secret Squirrel Show (1965) - Additional voicesThe Famous Adventures of Mr. Magoo (1965) - Prince Valor / Flattop / Egeus / Peter Quince / DemetriusThe Atom Ant Show (1965–1966) - Atom AntAlice in Wonderland or What's a Nice Kid Like You Doing in a Place Like This? (1966) - TV special - The White RabbitThe Archie Show (1968–1978) - Forsythe "Jughead" Jones, "Big Moose" Mason and Dilton DoileyThe Banana Splits in Hocus Pocus Park (1972) - Hocus / PocusMy Favorite Martians (1973) - Tim O'Hara / Bill Brennan / Brad Brennan / Okey / ChumpThe Love Boat (1978) - Cruise ship passenger / Stand-up comedianThe Plastic Man Comedy/Adventure Show (1979) - Doctor DomeLegends of the Superheroes (1979) - 2 TV specials - The Challenge and The Roast - Dr. SivanaFantasy Island (1980–1983) - 2 episodesShirt Tales- Shutter McBugg (1982) Trapper John, M.D. (1982–1984) - 5 episodes - Dr. Jerry Hannigan / Dr. Kauffman Alvin & the Chipmunks (1983)Deck the Halls with Wacky Walls (1983) - TV special - CrazylegsThe Yellow Rose (1984) - episode - Sport of Kings - Johnny HoganThe 13 Ghosts of Scooby-Doo (1985) - Bogel / Platypus Duck Star Fairies (1985) - TV special - Dragon Head #1Snorks (1985) - Additional voicesPaw Paws (1985–1986) - Trembly PawThe Flintstone Kids (1986-1988) - Additional voicesGalaxy High (1986) - Professor Icenstein / Luigi La BounciSesame Street (1986–1993) - 4 episodes - Jughead JonesAdventures of the Gummi Bears (1987) - Sir PaunchDuckTales (1987–1989) - Dr. Von Swine / Happy Jack / Additional voicesLittle Clowns of Happytown - Mr. PickleherringPopeye and Son - Bandini the GenieSuperman (1988) - episode - Triple-Play/The Circus - Prankster / Oswald LoomisThe New Yogi Bear Show (1988) - Additional voicesFantastic Max (1988-1989) - Additional voicesPolice Academy (1988-1989) - SweetchuckGarfield and Friends (1988–1994) - 121 episodes - Wade Duck / Fox / Wart / Worm / Wolf / additional voicesThe Further Adventures of SuperTed (1989) - Polka FaceThe Adventures of Ronald McDonald: McTreasure Island (1989) - Video Short - Hamburglar / Ben GunnMurder, She Wrote (1989) - episode - Something Borrowed, Someone Blue - Uncle ZiggyMidnight Patrol: Adventures in the Dream Zone (1990) - Dr. AkenhofferChip 'n Dale: Rescue Rangers (1990) - Maltese de SadeYo Yogi! (1991) - Murray / Additional voicesTaleSpin (1991) - Chief of Mondo Bondo / King Amok / Radio Announcer 2 / 18th Class Postal ClerkDumb and Dumber (1995) - Daddy / Old Man #2Duckman: Private Dick/Family Man (1996) - Ernest T. GlobCow and Chicken (1997–1999) - Flem / P.A. Announcer / Goon / Man 3 (2) / Man 3 (10) / Paramedic / Cootie Victim 1 / Intercom Voice / Pig / Kid (5) / Peasant (3) / General 1 / Peasant (4) / Kid 3 (4) / Man (6)Baywatch (1996) - Fella/ArthurI Am Weasel (1997–2000) - Additional voicesThe Wild Thornberrys (1999) - Lion #1 / Zebra All Grown Up! (2004) - Doctor

As directorThe Dick Van Dyke Show (1963–1965) - 5 episodes - The Ballad of the Betty Lou / A Nice, Friendly Game of Cards / Scratch My Car and Die / The Return of Edwin Carp / The Case of the PillowThe Andy Griffith Show (1964) - 8 episodes - Barney's Bloodhound / The Darling Baby / Andy and Helen Have Their Day / Three Wishes for Opie / Otis Sues the County / My Fair Ernest T. Bass / Barney's Physical / Family VisitGet Smart (1965) - episode - Mr. BigThe Patty Duke Show (1965) -Bewitched (1965–1966) - 3 episodes - We're in for a Bad Spell / Junior Executive / ProdigyHogan's Heroes (1965-1967) - 14 episodesA Secret Agent's Dilemma, or A Clear Case of Mind Over Mata Hari (1965) - TV movieGood Old Days (1966) - TV movieLaredo (1966) - episode - That's Noway, ThatawayWho's Minding the Mint? (1967)With Six You Get Eggroll (1968)Don't Drink the Water (1969)Laverne & Shirley (1977) - episode - Frank's FlingGoin' Coconuts (1978)The Beatrice Arthur Special (1980) - TV movieThe Love Boat (1981) - Season 4 Episode 14 From Here to Maternity / Jealousy / The TrigamistTrapper John, M.D.'' (1985–1986) - 2 episodes - Billboard Barney & Life, Death and Dr. Christmas

References

External links
 
 
 
 Miller, Stephen. "Howard Morris, 85, Comic Actor and Voiceover Artist," The New York Sun, Monday, May 23, 2005.

1919 births
2005 deaths
20th-century American male actors
21st-century American male actors
Male actors from New York City
American male stage actors
American male television actors
American male voice actors
American male film actors
United States Army personnel of World War II
American television directors
American sketch comedians
Filmation people
Burials at Hillside Memorial Park Cemetery
American voice directors
Jewish American male actors
People from the Bronx
United States Army soldiers
Hanna-Barbera people
Film directors from New York City